Moody and Pegg is a bittersweet British comedy-drama, produced by Thames Television for ITV between 1974 and 1975, and written by Donald Churchill and Julia Jones. Derek Waring and Judy Cornwell starred in this series that accented comedy but also had moments of drama. Waring played Roland Moody, a newly divorced 42-year-old junk/antique dealer greatly anticipating freedom from matrimonial ties. Cornwell was cast as Daphne Pegg, plain spinster and dedicated civil servant in her early thirties who leaves her home in Bolton after realising that her office boss will never agree to marry her. She heads for London in order to make a clean break from her past, but, owing to a rogue estate agent's dealings, finds that a man – Moody – also has a valid lease arrangement for the property she acquires. Unable to work out who is the squatter, they agree to be feuding partners and share, forging a very uncomfortable situation that is exacerbated by Moody's prodigious line of visiting girlfriends. Eventually, Moody loses in a winner-takes-all poker game and leaves, only to return in the second series.

The title theme is "The Free Life" by prolific library music composer Alan Parker.

Cast
 Judy Cornwell as Daphne Pegg
 Derek Waring as Roland Moody
 Frances Bennett as Monica Bakewell
 Tony Selby as Sid
 Sheila Keith as Aunt Ethel
 Peter Denyer as George
 Adrienne Posta as Iris

DVD release

External links
 
 Cathoderaytube.blogspot.com

ITV television dramas
1974 British television series debuts
1975 British television series endings
1970s British comedy television series
English-language television shows
Television shows produced by Thames Television
Television series by Fremantle (company)